The television series Ghost Writer ran for 25 episodes and was broadcast on TVB Jade in the second line series.

Episodic synopsis

See also
List of TVB dramas in 2010
Ghost Writer

Ghost Writer
Ghost Writer